Douglas Allan Girod (born May 5, 1958) is an American educator, medical doctor, and the 18th University of Kansas chancellor. Prior to becoming chancellor, he was the University of Kansas Medical Center's executive vice chancellor, a position he had held since February 2013. Before being promoted to the executive vice chancellor at the University of Kansas Medical Center, Girod was the senior dean for the School of Medicine while dually serving as a surgeon at the University of Kansas Health System where he began his career in 1994. He is also a veteran of the United States Navy Reserve.

Biography

Education
Born and raised in Salem, Oregon, Girod graduated from the University of California, Davis with a Bachelor of Science in chemistry, followed by University of California, San Francisco for his doctor of medicine, and completed his residency and an National Institute of Health research fellowship at the University of Washington in Seattle.

Career
Beginning in 1982, Girod began his 15-year career in the United States Navy Reserve where he worked at the Naval Hospital Oakland as a surgeon and the Director of Otolaryngology. In 1997, Girod was discharged from the military honorably, ending his career as a Lieutenant Commander. In 1994, Girod left California to become a surgeon at the KU Medical Center. During his time at the KU Medical Center, Girod was a professor, department chair, senior associate dean, interim executive dean, and his most recent post of executive vice chancellor.

University of Kansas chancellor 
On May 25, 2017, the Kansas Board of Regents announced Girod as the 18th chancellor of the University of Kansas. During his time as chancellor, Girod has increased the university's enrollment, established a partnership between Kansas Athletics, the University of Kansas Health System and Lawrence Memorial Health to create Kansas Team Health, a model that provides better care for student athletes and moved all healthcare professionals under the Kansas Health System's payroll.

A year into being chancellor, Girod fired athletic director Sheahon Zenger due to a lack of progress. Almost a month later, Girod hired Jeff Long as the new athletics director, tasking him to fix the football program. Long fired David Beaty at the end of the 2018 football season, ending with a 6–42 record at Kansas. Long then hired Les Miles to get the football program to become a championship program, however, he was fired on March 9, 2021, after accusations from women while he was at LSU. The next day, Girod fired Long as the athletics director.

In April 2021, Girod hired Travis Goff as the new athletics director, whose first task was to hire a new football coach. Almost a month later, Goff named Lance Leipold as the next football coach. Leipold, in just his second season, led the Jayhawks to a 5–0 start for the first time since 2008 and also coached the team to be bowl-eligible for the first time since 2008.

Personal life
Girod is married to Susan Pirtle and they have three children. Girod and his wife live in Lawrence, Kansas.

References

External links
 University of Kansas profile

Chancellors of the University of Kansas
University of Kansas faculty
University of California, Davis alumni
University of California, San Francisco alumni
University of Washington alumni
1958 births
Living people
Educators from Kansas
People from Salem, Oregon
United States Navy Medical Corps officers
Military personnel from Oregon
Leaders of the University of Kansas Medical Center